Hubley Township is a township in Schuylkill County, Pennsylvania, United States. The population was 865 at the 2010 census, an increase of a little more than 1% from the previous census in 2010.

Geography

Demographics

At the 2000 census there were 889 people, 345 households, and 260 families living in the township.  The population density was 68.0 people per square mile (26.2/km).  There were 369 housing units at an average density of 28.2/sq mi (10.9/km).  The racial makeup of the township was 99.21% White, 0.22% African American, 0.11% Asian, 0.22% Pacific Islander, 0.11% from other races, and 0.11% from two or more races. Hispanic or Latino of any race were 1.12%.

Of the 345 households 29.6% had children under the age of 18 living with them, 66.7% were married couples living together, 5.8% had a female householder with no husband present, and 24.6% were non-families. 21.2% of households were one person and 11.9% were one person aged 65 or older.  The average household size was 2.58 and the average family size was 2.98.

The age distribution was 21.7% under the age of 18, 6.7% from 18 to 24, 28.3% from 25 to 44, 23.3% from 45 to 64, and 19.9% 65 or older.  The median age was 41 years. For every 100 females, there were 107.7 males.  For every 100 females age 18 and over, there were 102.3 males.

The median household income was $41,250 and the median family income  was $46,538. Males had a median income of $32,734 versus $24,375 for females. The per capita income for the township was $17,377.  About 4.2% of families and 5.7% of the population were below the poverty line, including 4.6% of those under age 18 and 7.9% of those age 65 or over.

Gallery

References

Townships in Schuylkill County, Pennsylvania
Townships in Pennsylvania